Hammervatnet is a lake in the municipality of Levanger in Trøndelag county, Norway.  The  lake lies on the north side of the village of Åsen.  The European route E6 highway runs along the eastern tip of the lake.

The nearby lake Hoklingen flows into the river Fossingelva which flows into Hammervatnet.  The main outlet of Hammervatnet flows into the Hoplafjorden, an arm of the Trondheimsfjord.  There are two large islands in the lake Hammervatnet: Innerøya and Ytterøya.  The two islands are connected by a thin, marshy isthmus.

See also
List of lakes in Norway

References

Levanger
Lakes of Trøndelag